Nathan Stooke (born May 28, 1976, in Southern Illinois) is a male freestyle swimmer from the United States. He represented his native country at the 1998 World Aquatics Championships in Perth, Western Australia, competing in one individual event (25 km).

He maintains a 4.0 grade point average in spite of having dyslexia, which renders him unable to read. He has won all eight triathlons he has entered.

Currently, he is the assistant coach and president of the Seahawks swim Club.

References
USA Swimming

1976 births
Living people
American male freestyle swimmers
American long-distance swimmers
World Aquatics Championships medalists in open water swimming